Maurice Lindsay CBE (21 July 1918 – 30 April 2009) was a Scottish broadcaster, writer and poet. He was born in Glasgow. He was educated at The Glasgow Academy where he was a pupil from 1928-36. In later life, he served as an honorary governor of the school.

After serving in World War II, with the 7th Cameronians, he became a radio broadcaster, also editing the 1946 anthology Modern Scottish Poetry, and writing music criticism. He later was programme controller at Border Television.

In 1962, Scottish composer Thea Musgrave set five of his children's poems in Scots to music for voice and piano, in a song cycle called A Suite o Bairnsangs.

His Collected Poems (1974) drew on 12 published collections. He wrote a number of other books, including one on Robert Burns and a seminal biography of the composer Francis George Scott and mid-twentieth century Scottish classical music, entitled Francis George Scott and the Scottish Renaissance (1980).

Dr Lindsay was director of the Scottish Civic Trust, president of the Association for Scottish Literary Studies from 1989 to 1993, and was honorary secretary-general of Europa Nostra.

Select Bibliography
 The Discovery of Scotland, Robert Hale, 1964, 
 As I Remember: Ten Scottish Authors recall How Writing Began for Them, Editor, Robert Hale, 1979, 
 Francis George Scott and the Scottish Renaissance, Paul Harris, 1980  
 Count All Men Mortal: A History of Scottish Provident 1837 - 1987, Canongate Press, 1987, 
 Scottish Comic Verse, Editor, Robert Hale, 1981,  
 The Castles of Scotland, Constable & Robinson, 1986, 
 The Edinburgh Book of Twentieth-century Scottish Poetry (co-edited with Lesley Duncan), Edinburgh University Press, 2005,

Reviews
 Ross, Raymond J. (1980), Prophet Unhonoured, review of Francis George Scott and the Scottish Renaissance, in Cencrastus No. 4, Winter 1980-81, p. 37, 
 Donaldson, William (1981), review of Scottish Comic Verse, in Murray, Glen (ed.), Cencrastus No. 6, Autumn 1981, p. 43

Footnotes

 
 
 

1918 births
2009 deaths
Mass media people from Glasgow
People educated at the Glasgow Academy
British Army personnel of World War II
Cameronians officers
Commanders of the Order of the British Empire
Scottish television executives
Scottish broadcasters
Scottish Renaissance
Scottish biographers
20th-century Scottish poets
Scottish male poets
20th-century biographers
Lallans poets
20th-century British male writers
20th-century Scottish businesspeople
Male biographers